Bruno Stäblein (5. May 1895 in Munich – 6. March 1978 in Erlangen) was a German musicologist. He was a professor of musicology at the University of Regensburg. The focus of his work was the exploration of medieval music, in particular the exploration of the Gregorian chant.

Bibliography 
 Martin Ruhnke (1967). Festschrift Bruno Stäblein zum 70. Geburtstag. Bärenreiter, Kassel.

References

External links 
"Bruno-Stäblein-Archiv", Universitätsbibliothek Würzburg
 Bayerisches Musikerlexikon 
 Schritbild des einstimmingen Musik by Bruno Stäblein on Jstor

German music theorists
People from Munich
1895 births
1978 deaths
20th-century German musicologists